Pantelion Films is an American film production company that was created in 2010 and based in Santa Monica, California. The studio's goal is to bring wider theatrical distribution of movies aimed at Latino audiences. It is backed by TelevisaUnivision and Lionsgate. It has made theatrical relationships with movie exhibition chains including Regal Entertainment Group, AMC Theatres, Cinemex, and Cinemark. The studio's first film was 2011's From Prada to Nada, which Lionsgate and Grupo Televisa announced it had commissioned for a television series that did not materialize in 2012.

History
Pantelion Films bills itself as the first major Latino Hollywood film studio. It marks a transformation of Hollywood film studios in recognizing the fastest growing segment of the United States entertainment targeting Hispanic audiences.  Pantelion Films' stature within the film industry was raised further when it successfully acquired the U.S. distribution rights to the 2012 Will Ferrell film, Casa de Mi Padre. The studio was able to move Latino films from strictly being limited release films to a wider, single weekend release on more than 200 screens simultaneously. This was new to the United States with respect to Hispanic audiences and represented the first major attempt by a U.S. based studio to cater to Latino audiences in this manner.

The chairman of Pantelion is James M. McNamara, former chief executive of Telemundo, its chief executive was former Lionsgate executive, Paul Presburger, and its chief operating officer is Edward Allen. Pantelion Films said that Latinos were the fastest growing segment of the movie going audience and were loyal DVD consumers. As Lionsgate released many of Tyler Perry's films which reached an African American audience, Lionsgate and Grupo Televisa were striving for similar success with Latino audiences. McNamara said, "Latinos don't see themselves reflected in Hollywood movies" and said the studio's goal was to change that in their film releases. Pressberger said that the studio hoped to avoid the clichéd, stereotyped images of Latino life and culture. "We get out of the stereotypes of narco kings and drug dealers and gang members" in our films. Financially, tax breaks were "driving the decisions everywhere in the world," Presburger said as film companies including Pantelion looked to lower risks of investment through tax credit deals in the 2010s. An example of how Pantelion actively used tax breaks came in 2014 when it reached a multi-picture deal with Indomina Media of the Dominican Republic to produce up to four Spanish-language films annually to be released by Pantelion. The films were to be entirely produced in the Dominican Republic to take advantage of governmental film incentives.

Pantelion is not the first to target the Latino audience. Other attempts by U.S. studios to reach Latino audiences had met with little financial success. New Line Cinema struck a deal with the director of Mi Familia, Gregory Nava, to produce feature films for the Latino market. But that did not gain momentum and was discontinued. Other studios trying to reach the market were Samuel Goldwyn Films in the early 2000s and a venture between Universal Studios which had a distribution agreement with Arenas Entertainment, another Latino film and television series producer, was discontinued in 2003.  As the first decade of the 2000s continued,  some Spanish-language films received theatrical distribution from Latino-based exhibitors including Cinema Latino or on art circuits. But the business model of Pantelion was to have larger opening weekends in U.S. multiplexes than had ever been previously attempted instead of limited release and bicycling of a limited numbers of prints around the country.

The studio was able to place From Prada to Nada on 256 U.S. theater screens and the film brought in just over $3 million at the box office.  The Los Angeles Times viewed the studio's first film as a "modest" box office success and noted the heavy television advertising on Univision in an attempt to reach audiences in the 21 cities in which the film was released. The studio's debut film received an ALMA Award given to Alexa Vega as Favorite Movie Actor in a Comedy or Musical. The film's success was significant enough that Televisa and Lionsgate extended their business relationship to include television program development, including the From Prada to Nada series announced in 2012. The studio's follow up film to Prada, No Eres Tú, Soy Yo, reached 226 theaters though brought in less money with $1.3 million. The studio also picked up the U.S. rights for the foreign film Saving Private Perez which was placed on 161 U.S. screens and brought in $1.4 million at the box office. The studio released the Will Ferrell film Casa de Mi Padre in 2012 which would become the studio's highest-grossing title to that point with a $5.9 domestic box office total. The film was described as an "homage to classic westerns and telenovelas" and shot in Spanish. The studio's follow-up film, Girl in Progress opened on Mother's Day weekend and would gross over $2 million domestically. In 2013, Pressburber said that his company made a slight shift from low budget films to "films that incorporate Latino talent and Latino themes but have universal appeal and can resonate with a broad commercial audience."

Pantelion's biggest successes have come with star Eugenio Derbez whose Instructions Not Included led to a first-look deal with Derbez in 2014. The film set a record for the highest grossing Spanish-language film to date, earning $44.4 million in the United States and $99 million worldwide. The film opened on 348 screens in the United States on its first weekend handily winning the week's best per screen average with $22,547 per screen before expanding to 717 screens. Derbez's 2017 release "How to Be a Latin Lover" became the studio's highest weekend box office performer earning $12 million in the last weekend of April in 2017."

Pantelion also picked up its first English language film when it obtained the North American rights Paul Walker's film, Hours. Two weeks prior to the film's release date of December 13, 2013, Walker was killed in a car accident in Los Angeles, California on November 30, leaving Hours as the first film starring Walker to be released after his death. Pantelion's second English language feature was announced as Summer Camp starring Diego Boneta and directed by Alberto Marini, but was beaten to the theaters by George Lopez's Pantelion release, Spare Parts, and The Vatican Tapes. In 2015, Pantelion released Un Gallo con Muchos Huevos which was the first wide-release for a Mexican animated feature and followed that in 2016 with the animated, La Leyenda del Chupacabras.

Late in 2016, Hemisphere Media Group partnered with Lionsgate to create a subscription video on demand service incorporating Pantelion's film titles. The service called Pantaya launched in August 2017. In 2021, Hemisphere Media Group acquired full ownership rights to the Pantaya streaming service from Lionsgate for $124 million, following the latter's decision to focus on the expansion of its Starz brand.

Awards 
In 2019, Pantelion Films was awarded an Impact Award by the National Hispanic Media Coalition for their “Excellence in Production of Latino-Themed Content."

Films

Upcoming films

References

External links 
 Official site
  IMDB page on Pantelion Films

Film production companies of the United States
Mass media companies established in 2010
Film distributors of the United States
Lionsgate subsidiaries
Televisa subsidiaries
Hispanic and Latino American culture
Joint ventures